PP-14 Rawalpindi-VIII is a Constituency of Provincial Assembly of Punjab.

2008—2013: PP-9 (Rawalpindi-IX)

2013—2018: PP-9 (Rawalpindi-IX)
General elections were held on 11 May 2013. Asif Mehmood won this seat with 29797 votes.

All candidates receiving over 1,000 votes are listed here.

2018—2023 PP-14 (Rawalpindi-IX)
From 2018 PP-9 (Rawalpindi-IX) Become PP-14 Rawalpindi-IX With Some changes has follow
(a)The following Census Charges of Rawalpindi Cantonment (1) Charge No.3 excluding Circle No. 1, 2 and 3 (2) Charge No.4 (3) Charge No.5 and (4) Charge No.6
(b) The following Census Charges of Chaklala Cantonment (1) Charge No.5 excluding Circle No. 4 and (2) Charge No.6 of Rawalpindi District.

See also
 PP-13 Rawalpindi-VII
 PP-15 Rawalpindi-IX

References

External links
 Election commission Pakistan's official website
 Awazoday.com check result
 Official Website of Government of Punjab

R